WHDD (1020 AM; "Robin Hood Radio") is a radio station licensed to serve Sharon, Connecticut. WHDD airs a public radio format during daylight hours, but has to sign off at night to protect KDKA at Pittsburgh. The station's programming is also heard on WHDD-FM (91.9) in Sharon, and translator W248CZ (97.5 FM) in Kent.

History
The station signed on December 23, 1986, as WKZE. It was the parent station to WKZE-FM (98.1), which signed on in 1993. WKZE changed calls on October 31, 2006, to WHDD.

Translator

References

External links

NPR member stations
Community radio stations in the United States
Sharon, Connecticut
Radio stations established in 1986
1986 establishments in Connecticut
HDD
HDD (AM)